Visva-Bharati is a public central university and an Institution of National Importance located in Shantiniketan, West Bengal, India. It was founded by Rabindranath Tagore who called it Visva-Bharati, which means the communion of the world with India. Until independence it was a college. Soon after independence, the institution was given the status of a central university in 1951 by an act of the Parliament.

Overview
The Hindu writes, "Santiniketan in many ways is still quite different compared to other universities in the country. Located at Bolpur in Birbhum district of West Bengal, the university still has the rural trappings that Tagore dreamt of. The classes are still held in the open under the shade of huge mango trees and students and tutors alike still travel by cycles to keep pollution at bay. The old buildings, even those that were made up of mud walls and thatched roofs, are still intact and find a place within the main campus. While some are preserved for historical value, others are functional in all aspects. While for tourists the place could only be place for sight-seeing, the studious and the academically-inclined can easily feel the scholastic vibrations. Many, especially the Bengalis, have deep reverence for the place and take the visit as a pilgrimage to pay their respects to Tagore. Almost every festival, be it the local ‘ Poush mela' or the more universal ‘Raksha Bandhan' or ‘Holi,' is celebrated in its originality by the students, locals and staff on the campus... Tagore visualised it as a ‘seat of learning', and his vision was taken forward by Gandhiji and Jawaharlal Nehru. Both played a stellar role in its becoming a Central University in 1951."

History

The origins of the institution date back to 1863 when Debendranath Tagore was given a tract of land by the zamindar of Raipur, zamindar of Kirnahar and he set up an ashram at the spot that has now come to be called chatim tala at the heart of the town. The ashram was initially called Brahmacharya Ashram, which was later renamed Brahmacharya Vidyalaya. It was established with a view to encouraging people from all walks of life to come to the spot and meditate. In 1901 his youngest son Rabindranath Tagore established a co-educational school inside the premises of the ashram.

From 1901 onwards, Tagore used the ashram to organise the Hindu Mela, which soon became a centre of nationalist activity. Through the early twentieth century the zamindars of Surul (Sarkar Family), another neighbouring village, a few minutes by cycle from the Uttarayan Complex, and the zamindars of Taltore, a village just north of the university town, continued to sell their lands and other properties to the ashram and the college that was being built on this spot. The entire neighbourhood of Purbapalli belonged to the former zamindars of Taltore.

Rabindranath Tagore believed in open air education and had reservations about any teaching done within four walls. This was due to his belief that walls represent conditioning of mind. Tagore did not have a good opinion about the Western method of education introduced by the British in India; on this subject, Tagore and Gandhiji's opinion matched. Tagore once said, "I do not remember what I was taught, I only remember what I learnt." Tagore's idea on education was that every person is genius and that all students may not bloom at the same time. So he devised a new system of learning in Visva-Bharati. He allowed students to continue their course till the student and his teacher both are satisfied.

At Visva-Bharati, if a course demanded by a student is not available, then the university will design a course and bring teachers for that course. The university would not be bothered by the consideration of whether there is a demand for the course.

Campus
The nearest railway station is Bolpur (Santiniketan) on the Eastern Railway, the domestic air terminal is Kazi Nazrul Islam Airport, Durgapur and the international air terminal is Netaji Subhash Chandra Bose International Airport, Kolkata. The institute's buildings and departments are scattered among the two towns.

The twin towns of Santiniketan and Sriniketan are surrounded by Bolpur to the north, Kheya to the south, Surul to the east and Prantik to the west. The towns and the university are not far from the river Kopai which flows to the south.

Satellite campus
In 2018 at a cultural program in Indonesia, former officiating VC Sabuj Kali Sen in her tenure told to former MHRD Shri, Ramesh Pokhriyal Tagore’s connection with Ramgarh. He was immediately interested. On 8 July 2020 he Official announced to build the new campus at Ramgarh in Nainital district. She recalled, The University later responded to his suggestion and prepared the proposal. The Uttarakhand government has handed over 45 acres of land to the university free of cost to set up a campus. The university is keen to start five schools of studies at its first satellite centre in Nainital's Ramgarh from July 2022, Until the campus is ready, the university will function from a temporary campus. Ramgarh was one of Tagore's favourite holiday destinations, where he purchased a bungalow on a hilltop. Around 10 acres, on which the bungalow stands, is also likely to be given to the university, which plans to turn it into a museum to showcase Tagore's work. the centre would begin functioning with around 650 students in five schools of studies: language, art & culture, Himalayan studies, social science and public policy & good governance. "All the schools would be multi-disciplinary,"

Organisation and administration

Governance
The high officials of the university include the paridarshaka (visitor), pradhana (rector), acharya (chancellor), and the upacharya (vice-chancellor). The paridarshaka of this university is the president of India, the pradhana is the governor of West Bengal while the acharya is the prime minister. The samsad or University Court is the supreme authority of the University and has the power to review the acts of the Karma Samity (Executive Council) and the Siksha Samity (Academic Council). The Executive Council is the highest executive body of the University. The Academic Council is the highest academic body of the University and is responsible for the maintenance of standards of instruction, education and examination within the university. It has the right to advise the Executive Council on all academic matters.  The university is run by its Karma Samity (Executive Council) which is chaired by the acharya. The institutes and departments are located in both Santiniketan and Sriniketan.

Institutes and centres
The university is divided into institutes, centres, departments and schools. The respective departments are included in the institutes. The university's programmes dealing with its rich cultural heritage, as well as art and dance education, are funded by the Department of Science and Technology (DST), Government of India.

Kala Bhavana (Institute of Fine Arts)
Sangit Bhavana (Institute of Dance, Drama & Music)
Cheena Bhavana (Institute of Chinese Language and Culture)
Palli Samgathana Vibhaga (Institute of Rural Reconstruction)
 Rabindra Bhavana (Institute of Tagore Studies and Research) was founded, immediately after the poet's death, in July 1942. It is the focal point of the university. It has among its treasures a major part of Tagore's manuscripts, correspondences, paintings and sketches. It houses a museum, archives, library, audio-visual unit and preservation unit. The museum in the Vichitra building is open to the public at specified hours and is being expanded continually.
Hindi Bhavana - The foundation stone was laid by C.F. Andrews and Kshitimohan Sen and the tireless endeavour of Pandit Banarasidas Chaturvedi bore fruit with the completion of the Hindi-Bhavana building on 31 January 1939. Hindi Bhavana was inaugurated by Jawaharlal Nehru in February 1939.Hazari Prasad Dwivedi helped in founding the Hindi Bhavana and was its head for many years.
 Nippon Bhavana was formally inaugurated by K.R.Narayanan, then vice-president of India, on 3 February 1994. A 2-year certificate course and a 1-year diploma course were started in 1954. It was the first university in India to start Japanese language courses in India. In the initial stages Japanese Buddhism and language were taught in the department. As of 2019, the Department of Japanese Studies which is under Bhasha-Bhavana is housed at Nippon Bhavana. It has a library of its own consisting of books, mostly in Japanese, but also in English and other languages. The aim of the Bhavana is to build up a research centre.
Bangladesh Bhavana was inaugurated jointly by Narendra Modi, Prime Minister of India, and Sheikh Hasina, Prime Minister of Bangladesh, on 25 May 2018. Funded by the Bangladesh government, it has a 450-seat auditorium, the largest in the university. Housing a museum and a library, it is divided into four zones – Zone I : Undivided Bengal, Zone II: Chronicled phases of the language movement, Zone III: Bangladesh Liberation War and Zone IV: Rabindranath Tagore’s life in Bangladesh.
Siksha Bhavana (Institute of Science) comprises eleven constituents: ten departments (biotechnology, botany, chemistry, computer & system sciences, environmental studies, integrated science education & research, mathematics, physics, statistics and zoology) and one centre (Mathematics Education) where both teaching and research programmes are running leading to award of B.Sc.(Hons.), M.Sc., Integrated M.Sc. and Ph.D. degrees. It offers B.Sc. (Hons) and M.Sc, courses.
Vidya Bhavana (Institute of Humanities and Social Sciences) is the keystone of Tagore's concept of Visva-Bharati as a Centre of Indian Culture. It conducts under-graduate and post-graduate courses and has research facilities. It offers courses in Ancient Indian history, culture and archaeology, medieval & modern history, comparative religion, philosophy and economics & politics. It houses the centre for journalism and mass communication. A one-year integrated course on Indian culture and civilisation is offered to foreign students. It has a well-equipped Archaeological Museum. Vidya Bhavana offers certificate courses in Arabic, Assamese, Bengali, Chinese, French, German, Hindi, Italian, Japanese, Marathi, Odiya, Pali, Persian, Russian, Sanskrit, Santali, Tamil, Tibetan and Urdu.
Centre for Modern European Languages, Literature and Culture Studies was established in 2014 to promote an understanding of European civilisation and its diverse impact on the world. It offers certificate, diploma and undergraduate courses in French, German, Italian and Russian, and offers scope for post-graduate studies and research.
Bhasa Bhavana (Institute of Languages, Literature and Culture) houses English, Indian language departments (Sanskrit, Odia, Hindi, Bengali, Marathi) and foreign language departments (Chinese, Japanese, Indo-Tibetan, Arabic, Persian). There are undergraduate and post graduate courses.
Vinaya Bhavana (Institute of Education) was established in 1948 for training in art and craft and music and subsequently developed as a full-fledged Teachers Training College in 1951. It offers courses in education and physical education.
Palli Siksha Bhavana (Institute of Agricultural Science) at Sriniketan imparts education in Agricultural Sciences. It offers four-years (eight semesters) B Sc (Ag) Honours course and two-years M Sc (Ag) courses in agronomy, plant protection, agricultural extension, soil science & agricultural chemistry and horticulture. There are facilities for research leading to Ph D degree. It is also engaged in extension activities. It was established on 1 September 1963 as Palli- Siksha Sadana and renamed as Palli Siksha Bhavana in 1983.

Schools
Patha Bhavana: It is not only the oldest school of the university but also the oldest institution on which the university was subsequently built. It is the university school of Santiniketan. Initially called Ashram Vidyalaya it was later called Santiniketan Vidyalaya. It was started by Tagore in 1901. The distinctive features of this co-educational school include its open-air classrooms and emphasis upon oriental learning. The school, being the nucleus of the university and the town is within the Santiniketan Ashram. The first four students of the school included Tagore's son Rathindranath Tagore, the first upacharya of the university and Sudhi Ranjan Das, a chief justice of India. The future Nobel Laureate in economics, Amartya Sen, graduated from this school. So did one of the first Indian Rhodes scholars, Asim Datta. Supriyo Tagore, a great grandson of Satyendranath Tagore, the eldest brother of the poet, was one of its longest serving and most well known Principals. The eminent historians, Tapan Raychaudhuri and Ashin Dasgupta have periodically taken classes here.
Mrinalini Ananda Pathsala: Founded in 1954, it was named after Rabindranath Tagore's wife Mrinalini Devi. It is a preparatory school for Patha Bhavana. It is housed in the Notun Bari and Dehali.
Santosh Pathsala: Founded in 1988, it is a kindergarten named after Santosh Chandra Majumdar. It is a preparatory school for Siksha Satra.
Siksha Satra: It was founded in 1924. It was later shifted to Sriniketan in 1927. The students are from the neighbouring villages.
Uttar Shiksha Sadana: This school was started in 1976.

Academics

Rankings

The National Institutional Ranking Framework (NIRF) ranked Visva-Bharati 69th overall in India and 50th among universities in India. According to Best Global Universities 2020 ranking produced by U.S. News & World Report, Visva- Bharati ranked 4th among Indian universities.

Library
Visva-Bharati Library was established in 1901, at the time of foundation of the Brahmacharya Asrama at Santiniketan by Rabindranath Tagore. Presently, Visva-Bharati Library System has a Central Library, 12 Sectional libraries attached with Cheena-Bhavana, Siksha-Bhavana, Patha-Bhavana, Darshan Sadan, Hindi-Bhavana, Sangit-Bhavana, Palli Sangathan Vibhaga, Vinaya-Bhavana, Rabindra-Bhavana, Palli Siksha Bhavana, Kala-Bhavana and Siksha-Satra. Moreover, around 30 Seminar Libraries are in operation attached to different departments. 

Visva-Bharati library contains old and rare documents, which include multi-lingual and multi-discipline books, reports, manuscripts, etc. The library also has a number of important collections; mention may be made of the collections of Rabindranath Tagore, Prabodh Chandra.

Guest houses
The university has two guest houses: Ratan Kuthi (named after industrialist Ratan Tata) and Purba Palli Guest House.

Student life

Cultural festivals
This university is especially famous for its cultural festivals:

 Basanta Utsab (Spring Festival): This festival is identified with doljatra or holi, which is held on the grounds in front of Patha Bhavana.
 Poush Mela (Winter Fair): It is the annual winter fair which is held every Poush which coincides with December on Purono Melar Maath opposite the ashram and next to the Uttarayan complex, as well as on Melar Maath (Bhubandangar Maath), which is next to the administrative block. The fair is meant to encourage the local people of Birbhum and outlying districts to come and exhibit and sell their wares. Jatras, such as Alkap, are staged and Bouls perform at the fair. On the first day of the fair, (23 December), the university organises an Upasana Sabha at Chatimtala (under a chatim tree), the spot where Maharshi Debendranath Tagore established his ashram for the first time in 1863. On 24 December the university organises a display of lights and fireworks on Melar Maath, a custom started by the poet, Rabindranath Tagore himself. On Christmas Day, the university organises the Christo Utsab, which is meant as a mark of respect for all religions.

Controversy 
The university fired the Professor of Economics, Prof Sudipta Bhattacharya for allegedly supporting the student protests against the Vice Chancellor Bidyut Chakraborty's undemocratic action and attempts of saffronisation of the university. The university, however claimed that the removal of Professor is based on damaging the academic environment of the university. 261 academics came out for the support of Prof Sudipta Bhattacharya including Noam Chomsky, Prabhat Patnaik, Utsa Patnaik, Amiya Kumar Bagchi etc.

Notable alumni and faculties

See also
 Kala Bhavana
 List of universities in India
 The Last Harvest: Paintings of Rabindranath Tagore

References

External links

 

 
Universities and colleges in Birbhum district
Art schools in India
Central universities in India
Memorials to Rabindranath Tagore
Academic institutions associated with the Bengal Renaissance
Educational institutions established in 1921
1901 establishments in India
1921 establishments in British India
Universities in West Bengal